Field Marshal Horatio Herbert Kitchener, 1st Earl Kitchener,  (24 June 1850 – 5 June 1916) was a senior British Army officer and colonial administrator. Kitchener came to prominence for his imperial campaigns, his involvement in the Second Boer War, and his central role in the early part of the First World War.

Kitchener was credited in 1898 for having won the Battle of Omdurman and securing control of the Sudan, for which he was made Baron Kitchener of Khartoum. As Chief of Staff (1900–1902) in the Second Boer War he played a key role in Roberts' conquest of the Boer Republics, then succeeded Roberts as commander-in-chief – by which time Boer forces had taken to guerrilla fighting and British forces imprisoned Boer civilians in concentration camps. His term as Commander-in-Chief (1902–1909) of the Army in India saw him quarrel with another eminent proconsul, the Viceroy Lord Curzon, who eventually resigned. Kitchener then returned to Egypt as British Agent and Consul-General (de facto administrator).

In 1914, at the start of the First World War, Kitchener became Secretary of State for War, a Cabinet Minister. One of the few to foresee a long war, lasting for at least three years, and also having the authority to act effectively on that perception, he organised the largest volunteer army that Britain had seen, and oversaw a significant expansion of materiel production to fight on the Western Front. Despite having warned of the difficulty of provisioning for a long war, he was blamed for the shortage of shells in the spring of 1915 – one of the events leading to the formation of a coalition government – and stripped of his control over munitions and strategy.

Kitchener was among 737 who died; he was the highest ranking British officer to die in action in the entire war.

Early life

Kitchener was born in Ballylongford near Listowel, County Kerry, in Ireland, son of army officer Henry Horatio Kitchener (1805–1894) and Frances Anne Chevallier (died 1864; daughter of John Chevallier, a clergyman, of Aspall Hall, and his third wife, Elizabeth, née Cole).

Both sides of Kitchener's family were from Suffolk, and could trace their descent to the reign of William III; his mother's family was of French Huguenot descent. His father had only recently sold his commission and bought land in Ireland, under the Encumbered Estates Act of 1849 designed to encourage investment into Ireland after the Irish Famine. They then moved to Switzerland, where the young Kitchener was educated at Montreux, then at the Royal Military Academy, Woolwich. Pro-French and eager to see action, he joined a French field ambulance unit in the Franco-Prussian War. His father took him back to Britain after he caught pneumonia while ascending in a balloon to see the French Army of the Loire in action.

Commissioned into the Royal Engineers on 4 January 1871, his service in France had violated British neutrality, and he was reprimanded by the Duke of Cambridge, the commander-in-chief. He served in Palestine, Egypt and Cyprus as a surveyor, learned Arabic, and prepared detailed topographical maps of the areas. His brother, Lt. Gen. Sir Walter Kitchener, had also entered the army, and was Governor of Bermuda from 1908 to 1912.

Survey of western Palestine
In 1874, aged 24, Kitchener was assigned by the Palestine Exploration Fund to a mapping-survey of the Holy Land, replacing Charles Tyrwhitt-Drake, who had died of malaria. By then an officer in the Royal Engineers, Kitchener joined fellow officer Claude R. Conder; between 1874 and 1877 they surveyed Palestine, returning to England only briefly in 1875 after an attack by locals at Safed, in Galilee.

Conder and Kitchener's expedition became known as the Survey of Western Palestine because it was largely confined to the area west of the Jordan River. The survey collected data on the topography and toponymy of the area, as well as local flora and fauna.

The results of the survey were published in an eight-volume series, with Kitchener's contribution in the first three tomes (Conder and Kitchener 1881–1885). This survey has had a lasting effect on the Middle East for several reasons:
 It serves as the basis for the grid system used in the modern maps of Israel and Palestine;
 The data compiled by Conder and Kitchener are still consulted by archaeologists and geographers working in the southern Levant;
 The survey itself effectively delineated and defined the political borders of the southern Levant. For example, the modern border between Israel and Lebanon is established at the point in upper Galilee where Conder and Kitchener's survey stopped.

In 1878, having completed the survey of western Palestine, Kitchener was sent to Cyprus to undertake a survey of that newly acquired British protectorate. He became vice-consul in Anatolia in 1879.

Egypt
On 4 January 1883 Kitchener was promoted to captain, given the Turkish rank binbasi (major), and dispatched to Egypt, where he took part in the reconstruction of the Egyptian Army.

Egypt had recently become a British puppet state, its army led by British officers, although still nominally under the sovereignty of the Khedive (Egyptian viceroy) and his nominal overlord the (Ottoman) Sultan of Turkey. Kitchener became second-in-command of an Egyptian cavalry regiment in February 1883, and then took part in the failed Nile Expedition to relieve Charles George Gordon in the Sudan in late 1884.

Fluent in Arabic, Kitchener preferred the company of the Egyptians over the British, and the company of no-one over the Egyptians, writing in 1884 that: "I have become such a solitary bird that I often think I were happier alone". Kitchener spoke Arabic so well that he was able to effortlessly adopt the dialects of the different Bedouin tribes of Egypt and the Sudan.

Promoted to brevet major on 8 October 1884 and to brevet lieutenant-colonel on 15 June 1885, he became the British member of the Zanzibar boundary commission in July 1885. He became Governor of the Egyptian Provinces of Eastern Sudan and Red Sea Littoral (which in practice consisted of little more than the Port of Suakin) in September 1886, also Pasha the same year, and led his forces in action against the followers of the Mahdi at Handub in January 1888, when he was injured in the jaw.

Kitchener was promoted to brevet colonel on 11 April 1888 and to the substantive rank of major on 20 July 1889 and led the Egyptian cavalry at the Battle of Toski in August 1889. At the beginning of 1890 he was appointed Inspector General of the Egyptian police 1888–92 before moving to the position of Adjutant-General of the Egyptian Army in December of the same year and Sirdar (Commander-in-Chief) of the Egyptian Army with the local rank of brigadier in April 1892.

Kitchener was worried that, although his moustache was bleached white by the sun, his blond hair refused to turn grey, making it harder for Egyptians to take him seriously. His appearance added to his mystique: his long legs made him appear taller, whilst a cast in his eye made people feel he was looking right through them.

Sir Evelyn Baring, the de facto British ruler of Egypt, thought Kitchener "the most able (soldier) I have come across in my time". In 1890, a War Office evaluation of Kitchener concluded: "A good brigadier, very ambitious, not popular, but has of late greatly improved in tact and manner ... a fine gallant soldier and good linguist and very successful in dealing with Orientals" [in the 19th century, Europeans called the Middle East the Orient].

While in Egypt, Kitchener was initiated into Freemasonry in 1883 in the Italian-speaking La Concordia Lodge No. 1226, which met in Cairo. In November 1899 he was appointed the first District Grand Master of the District Grand Lodge of Egypt and the Sudan, under the United Grand Lodge of England.

Sudan and Khartoum

 In 1896, the British Prime Minister, Lord Salisbury, was concerned with keeping France out of the Horn of Africa. A French expedition under the command of Jean-Baptiste Marchand had left Dakar in March 1896 with the aim of conquering the Sudan, seizing control of the Nile as it flowed into Egypt, and forcing the British out of Egypt; thus restoring Egypt to the place within the French sphere of influence that it had had prior to 1882. Salisbury feared that if the British did not conquer the Sudan, the French would. He had supported Italy's ambitions to conquer Ethiopia in the hope that the Italians would keep the French out of Ethiopia. The Italian attempt to conquer Ethiopia, however, was going very badly by early 1896, and ended with the Italians being annihilated at the Battle of Adowa in March 1896. In March 1896, with the Italians visibly failing and the Mahdiyah state threatening to conquer Eritrea, Salisbury ordered Kitchener to invade northern Sudan, ostensibly for the purpose of distracting the Ansar (whom the British called "Dervishes") from attacking the Italians.

Kitchener won victories at the Battle of Ferkeh in June 1896 and the Battle of Hafir in September 1896, earning him national fame in the United Kingdom and promotion to major-general on 25 September 1896. Kitchener's cold personality and his tendency to drive his men hard made him widely disliked by his fellow officers. One officer wrote about Kitchener in September 1896: "He was always inclined to bully his own entourage, as some men are rude to their wives. He was inclined to let off his spleen on those around him. He was often morose and silent for hours together ... he was even morbidly afraid of showing any feeling or enthusiasm, and he preferred to be misunderstood rather than be suspected of human feeling." Kitchener had served on the Wolseley expedition to rescue General Gordon at Khartoum, and was convinced that the expedition failed because Wolseley had used boats coming up the Nile to bring his supplies. Kitchener wanted to build a railroad to supply the Anglo-Egyptian army, and assigned the task of constructing the Sudan Military Railroad to a Canadian railroad builder, Percy Girouard, for whom he had specifically asked.

Kitchener achieved further successes at the Battle of Atbara in April 1898, and then the Battle of Omdurman in September 1898. After marching to the walls of Khartoum, he placed his army into a crescent shape with the Nile to the rear, together with the gunboats in support. This enabled him to bring overwhelming firepower against any attack of the Ansar from any direction, though with the disadvantage of having his men spread out thinly, with hardly any forces in reserve. Such an arrangement could have proven disastrous if the Ansar had broken through the thin khaki line. At about 5 a.m. on 2 September 1898, a huge force of Ansar, under the command of the Khalifa himself, came out of the fort at Omdurman, marching under their black banners inscribed with Koranic quotations in Arabic; this led Bennet Burleigh, the Sudan correspondent of The Daily Telegraph, to write: "It was not alone the reverberation of the tread of horses and men's feet I heard and seemed to feel as well as hear, but a voiced continuous shouting and chanting-the Dervish invocation and battle challenge "Allah e Allah Rasool Allah el Mahdi!" they reiterated in vociferous rising measure, as they swept over the intervening ground". Kitchener had the ground carefully studied so that his officers would know the best angle of fire, and had his army open fire on the Ansar first with artillery, then machine guns and finally rifles as the enemy advanced. A young Winston Churchill, serving as an army officer, wrote of what he saw: "A ragged line of men were coming on desperately, struggling forward in the face of the pitiless fireblack banners tossing and collapsing; white figures subsiding in dozens to the ground ... valiant men were struggling on through a hell of whistling metal, exploding shells, and spurting dustsuffering, despairing, dying". By about 8:30 am, much of the Dervish army was dead; Kitchener ordered his men to advance, fearing that the Khalifa might escape with what was left of his army to the fort of Omdurman, forcing Kitchener to lay siege to it.

Viewing the battlefield from horseback on the hill at Jebel Surgham, Kitchener commented: "Well, we have given them a damn good dusting". As the British and Egyptians advanced in columns, the Khalifa attempted to outflank and encircle the columns; this led to desperate hand-to-hand fighting. Churchill wrote of his own experience as the 21st Lancers cut their way through the Ansar: "The collision was prodigious and for perhaps ten wonderful seconds, no man heeded his enemy. Terrified horses wedged in the crowd, bruised and shaken men, sprawling in heaps, struggle dazed and stupid, to their feet, panted and looked about them". The Lancers' onslaught carried them through the 12-men-deep Ansar line with the Lancers losing 71 dead and wounded while killing hundreds of the enemy. Following the annihilation of his army, the Khalifa ordered a retreat and early in the afternoon, Kitchener rode in triumph into Omdurman and immediately ordered that the thousands of Christians enslaved by the Ansar were now all free people. Kitchener lost fewer than 500 men while killing about 11,000 and wounding 17,000 of the Ansar. Burleigh summed the general mood of the British troops: "At Last! Gordon has been avenged and justified. The dervishes have been overwhelming routed, Mahdism has been "smashed", while the Khalifa's capital of Omdurman has been stripped of its barbaric halo of sanctity and invulnerability. Kitchener promptly had the Mahdi's tomb blown up to prevent it from becoming a rallying point for his supporters, and had his bones scattered. Queen Victoria, who had wept when she heard of General Gordon's death, now wept for the man who had vanquished Gordon, asking whether it had been really necessary for Kitchener to desecrate the Mahdi's tomb.The body of the Mahdi was disinterred and beheaded. This symbolic decapitation echoed General Gordon's death at the hands of the Mahdist forces in 1885. The headless body of the Mahdi was thrown into the Nile. Kitchener kept the Mahdī's skull and it was rumoured that he intended to use it as a drinking cup or ink well. In a letter to his mother, Churchill wrote that the victory at Omdurman had been "disgraced by the inhuman slaughter of the wounded and ... Kitchener is responsible for this". There is no evidence that Kitchener ordered his men to shoot the wounded Ansar on the field of Omdurman, but he did give before the battle what the British journalist Mark Urban called a "mixed message", saying that mercy should be given, while at the same time saying "Remember Gordon" and that the enemy were all "murderers" of Gordon. The victory at Omdurman made Kitchener into a popular war hero, and gave him a reputation for efficiency and as a man who got things done. The journalist G. W. Steevens wrote in the Daily Mail that "He [Kitchener] is more like a machine than a man. You feel that he ought to be patented and shown with pride at the Paris International Exhibition. British Empire: Exhibit No. 1 hors concours, the Sudan Machine". The shooting of the wounded at Omdurman, along with the desecration of the Mahdi's tomb, gave Kitchener a reputation for brutality that was to dog him for the rest of his life, and posthumously.
 
After Omdurman, Kitchener opened a special sealed letter from Salisbury that told him that Salisbury's real reason for ordering the conquest of the Sudan was to prevent France from moving into the Sudan, and that the talk of "avenging Gordon" had been just a pretext. Salisbury's letter ordered Kitchener to head south as soon as possible to evict Marchand before he got a chance to become well-established on the Nile. On 18 September 1898, Kitchener arrived at the French fort at Fashoda (present day Kodok, on the west bank of the Nile north of Malakal) and informed Marchand that he and his men had to leave the Sudan at once, a request Merchand refused, leading to a tense stand-off as French and British soldiers aimed their weapons at each other. During what became known as the Fashoda Incident, Britain and France almost went to war with each other. The Fashoda incident caused much jingoism and chauvinism on both sides of the English Channel; however, at Fashoda itself, despite the stand-off with the French, Kitchener established cordial relations with Marchand. They agreed that the tricolor would fly equally with the Union Jack and the Egyptian flag over the disputed fort at Fashoda. Kitchener was a Francophile who spoke fluent French, and despite his reputation for brusque rudeness was very diplomatic and tactful in his talks with Marchand; for example, congratulating him on his achievement in crossing the Sahara in an epic trek from Dakar to the Nile. In November 1898, the crisis ended when the French agreed to withdraw from the Sudan. Several factors persuaded the French to back down. These included British naval superiority; the prospect of an Anglo-French war leading to the British gobbling up the entire French colonial empire after the defeat of the French Navy; the pointed statement from the Russian Emperor Nicholas II that the Franco-Russian alliance applied only to Europe, and that Russia would not go to war against Britain for the sake of an obscure fort in the Sudan in which no Russian interests were involved; and the possibility that Germany might take advantage of an Anglo-French war to strike France.

Kitchener became Governor-General of the Sudan in September 1898, and began a programme of restoring good governance. The programme had a strong foundation, based on education at Gordon Memorial College as its centrepieceand not simply for the children of the local elites, for children from anywhere could apply to study. He ordered the mosques of Khartoum rebuilt, instituted reforms which recognised Fridaythe Muslim holy dayas the official day of rest, and guaranteed freedom of religion to all citizens of the Sudan. He attempted to prevent evangelical Christian missionaries from trying to convert Muslims to Christianity.

At this stage of his career Kitchener was keen to exploit the press, cultivating G. W. Steevens of the Daily Mail who wrote a book With Kitchener to Khartum. Later, as his legend had grown, he was able to be rude to the press, on one occasion in the Second Boer War bellowing: "Get out of my way, you drunken swabs". He was created Baron Kitchener, of Khartoum and of Aspall in the County of Suffolk, on 31 October 1898.

Anglo-Boer War

During the Second Boer War, Kitchener arrived in South Africa with Field Marshal Lord Roberts on the RMS Dunottar Castle along with massive British reinforcements in December 1899. Officially holding the title of chief of staff, he was in practice a second-in-command and was present at the relief of Kimberley before leading an unsuccessful frontal assault at the Battle of Paardeberg in February 1900. Kitchener was mentioned in despatches from Roberts several times during the early part of the war; in a despatch from March 1900 Roberts wrote how he was "greatly indebted to him for his counsel and cordial support on all occasions".

Following the defeat of the conventional Boer forces, Kitchener succeeded Roberts as overall commander in November 1900. He was also promoted to lieutenant-general on 29 November 1900 and to local general on 12 December 1900. He subsequently inherited and expanded the successful strategies devised by Roberts to force the Boer commandos to submit, including concentration camps and the burning of farms. Conditions in the concentration camps, which had been conceived by Roberts as a form of control of the families whose farms he had destroyed, began to degenerate rapidly as the large influx of Boers outstripped the ability of the minuscule British force to cope. The camps lacked space, food, sanitation, medicine, and medical care, leading to rampant disease and a very high death rate for those Boers who entered. Eventually 26,370 women and children (81% were children) died in the concentration camps. The biggest critic of the camps was the English humanitarian and welfare worker Emily Hobhouse. She published a prominent report that highlighted atrocities committed by Kitchener's soldiers and administration, creating considerable debate in London about the war. Kitchener blocked Hobhouse from returning to South Africa by invoking martial law provisions.

Historian Caroline Elkins characterized Kitchener's conduct of the war as a "scorched earth policy", as his forces razed homesteads, poisoned wells and implemented concentration camps, as well as turned women and children into targets in the war.

The Treaty of Vereeniging, ending the War, was signed in May 1902 following a tense six months. During this period Kitchener struggled against Sir Alfred Milner, the Governor of the Cape Colony, and the British government. Milner was a hard-line conservative and wanted forcibly to Anglicise the Afrikaans people (the Boers), and Milner and the British government wanted to assert victory by forcing the Boers to sign a humiliating peace treaty; Kitchener wanted a more generous compromise peace treaty that would recognize certain rights for the Afrikaners and promise future self-government. He even entertained a peace treaty proposed by Louis Botha and the other Boer leaders, although he knew the British government would reject the offer; this would have maintained the sovereignty of the South African Republic and the Orange Free State while requiring them to sign a perpetual treaty of alliance with the UK and grant major concessions to the British, such as equal rights for English with Dutch in their countries, voting rights for Uitlanders, and a customs and railway union with the Cape Colony and Natal. During Kitchener's posting in South Africa, Kitchener became acting High Commissioner of South Africa, and administrator of Transvaal and Orange River Colony in 1901.

Kitchener, who had been promoted to the substantive rank of general on 1 June 1902, was hosted to a farewell reception at Cape Town on 23 June, and left for the United Kingdom in the SS Orotava on the same day. He received an enthusiastic welcome on his arrival the following month. Landing in Southampton on 12 July, he was greeted by the corporation, who presented him with the Freedom of the borough. In London, he was met at the train station by The Prince of Wales, drove in a procession through streets lined by military personnel from 70 different units and watched by thousands of people, and received a formal welcome at St James's Palace. He also visited King Edward VII, who was confined to his room recovering from his recent operation for appendicitis, but wanted to meet the general on his arrival and to personally bestow on him the insignia of the Order of Merit (OM). Kitchener was created Viscount Kitchener, of Khartoum and of the Vaal in the Colony of Transvaal and of Aspall in the County of Suffolk, on 28 July 1902.

Court-martial of Breaker Morant

In the Breaker Morant case, five Australian officers and one English officer of an irregular unit, the Bushveldt Carbineers, were court-martialed for summarily executing twelve Boer prisoners, and also for the murder of a German missionary believed to be a Boer sympathiser, all allegedly under unwritten orders approved by Kitchener. The celebrated horseman and bush poet Lt. Harry "Breaker" Morant and Lt. Peter Handcock were found guilty, sentenced to death, and shot by firing squad at Pietersburg on 27 February 1902. Their death warrants were personally signed by Kitchener. He reprieved a third soldier, Lt. George Witton, who served 28 months before being released.

India

In late 1902 Kitchener was appointed Commander-in-Chief, India, and arrived there to take up the position in November, in time to be in charge during the January 1903 Delhi Durbar. He immediately began the task of reorganising the Indian Army. Kitchener's plan "The Reorganisation and Redistribution of the Army in India" recommended preparing the Indian Army for any potential war by reducing the size of fixed garrisons and reorganising it into two armies, to be commanded by Generals Sir Bindon Blood and George Luck.

While many of the Kitchener Reforms were supported by the Viceroy, Lord Curzon of Kedleston, who had originally lobbied for Kitchener's appointment, the two men eventually came into conflict. Curzon wrote to Kitchener advising him that signing himself "Kitchener of Khartoum" took up too much time and space – Kitchener commented on the pettiness of this (Curzon simply signed himself "Curzon" as an hereditary peer, although he later took to signing himself "Curzon of Kedleston"). They also clashed over the question of military administration, as Kitchener objected to the system whereby transport and logistics were controlled by a "Military Member" of the Viceroy's Council. The Commander-in-Chief won the crucial support of the government in London, and the Viceroy chose to resign.

Later events proved Curzon was right in opposing Kitchener's attempts to concentrate all military decision-making power in his own office. Although the offices of Commander-in-Chief and Military Member were now held by a single individual, senior officers could approach only the Commander-in-Chief directly. In order to deal with the Military Member, a request had to be made through the Army Secretary, who reported to the Indian Government and had right of access to the Viceroy. There were even instances when the two separate bureaucracies produced different answers to a problem, with the Commander-in-Chief disagreeing with himself as Military Member. This became known as "the canonisation of duality". Kitchener's successor, General Sir O'Moore Creagh, was nicknamed "no More K", and concentrated on establishing good relations with the Viceroy, Lord Hardinge.

Kitchener presided over the Rawalpindi Parade in 1905 to honour the Prince and Princess of Wales's visit to India. That same year Kitchener founded the Indian Staff College at Quetta (now the Pakistan Command and Staff College), where his portrait still hangs. His term of office as Commander-in-Chief, India, was extended by two years in 1907.

Kitchener was promoted to the highest Army rank, Field Marshal, on 10 September 1909 and went on a tour of Australia and New Zealand. He aspired to be Viceroy of India, but the Secretary of State for India, John Morley, was not keen and hoped to send him instead to Malta as Commander-in-Chief of British forces in the Mediterranean, even to the point of announcing the appointment in the newspapers. Kitchener pushed hard for the Viceroyalty, returning to London to lobby Cabinet ministers and the dying King Edward VII, from whom, whilst collecting his field marshal's baton, Kitchener obtained permission to refuse the Malta job. However, Morley could not be moved. This was perhaps in part because Kitchener was thought to be a Tory (the Liberals were in office at the time); perhaps due to a Curzon-inspired whispering campaign; but most importantly because Morley, who was a Gladstonian and thus suspicious of imperialism, felt it inappropriate, after the recent grant of limited self-government under the 1909 Indian Councils Act, for a serving soldier to be Viceroy (in the event, no serving soldier was appointed Viceroy until Lord Wavell in 1943, during the Second World War). The prime minister, H. H. Asquith, was sympathetic to Kitchener but was unwilling to overrule Morley, who threatened resignation, so Kitchener was finally turned down for the post of Viceroy of India in 1911.

From 22 to 24 June 1911, Kitchener took part in the Coronation of King George V and Mary. Kitchener assumed the role of Captain of the Escort, responsible for the personal protection of the royals during the coronation. In this capacity, Kitchener was also the Field Marshal, In Command of the Troops, and assumed command of the 55,000 British and imperial soldiers present in London. During the Coronation ceremony itself, Kitchener acted as Third Sword, one of the four swords tasked with guarding the monarch. Later, in November 1911, Kitchener hosted the King and Queen in Port Said, Egypt while they were on their way to India for the Delhi Durbar to assume the titles of Emperor and Empress of India.

Return to Egypt
In June 1911 Kitchener then returned to Egypt as British Agent and Consul-General in Egypt during the formal reign of Abbas Hilmi II as Khedive.

At the time of the Agadir Crisis (summer 1911), Kitchener told the Committee of Imperial Defence that he expected the Germans to walk through the French "like partridges" and he informed Lord Esher "that if they imagined that he was going to command the Army in France he would see them damned first".

He was created Earl Kitchener, of Khartoum and of Broome in the County of Kent, on 29 June 1914.

During this period he became a proponent of Scouting and coined the phrase "once a Scout, always a Scout".

First World War

1914

Raising the New Armies

At the outset of the First World War, the prime minister, Asquith, quickly had Kitchener appointed Secretary of State for War; Asquith had been filling the job himself as a stopgap following the resignation of Colonel Seely over the Curragh Incident earlier in 1914. Kitchener was in Britain on his annual summer leave, between 23 June and 3 August 1914, and had boarded a cross-Channel steamer to commence his return trip to Cairo when he was recalled to London to meet with Asquith. War was declared at 11pm the next day.

Against cabinet opinion, Kitchener correctly predicted a long war that would last at least three years, require huge new armies to defeat Germany, and cause huge casualties before the end would come. Kitchener stated that the conflict would plumb the depths of manpower "to the last million". A massive recruitment campaign began, which soon featured a distinctive poster of Kitchener, taken from a magazine front cover. It may have encouraged large numbers of volunteers, and has proven to be one of the most enduring images of the war, having been copied and parodied many times since. Kitchener built up the "New Armies" as separate units because he distrusted the Territorials from what he had seen with the French Army in 1870. This may have been a mistaken judgement, as the British reservists of 1914 tended to be much younger and fitter than their French equivalents a generation earlier.

Cabinet Secretary Maurice Hankey wrote of Kitchener:

However, Ian Hamilton later wrote of Kitchener "he hated organisations; he smashed organisations ... he was a Master of Expedients".

Deploying the BEF
At the War Council (5 August) Kitchener and Lieutenant General Sir Douglas Haig argued that the BEF should be deployed at Amiens, where it could deliver a vigorous counterattack once the route of German advance was known. Kitchener argued that the deployment of the BEF in Belgium would result in having to retreat and abandon much of its supplies almost immediately, as the Belgian Army would be unable to hold its ground against the Germans; Kitchener was proved right, but given the belief in fortresses common at the time, it is not surprising that the War Council disagreed with him.

Kitchener, believing Britain should husband her resources for a long war, decided at Cabinet (6 August) that the initial BEF would consist of only 4 infantry divisions (and 1 cavalry), not the 5 or 6 promised. His decision to hold back two of the six divisions of the BEF, although based on exaggerated concerns about German invasion of Britain, arguably saved the BEF from disaster as Sir John French (on the advice of Sir Henry Wilson who was much influenced by the French), might have been tempted to advance further into the teeth of the advancing German forces, had his own force been stronger.

Kitchener's wish to concentrate further back at Amiens may also have been influenced by a largely accurate map of German dispositions which was published by Repington in The Times on the morning of 12 August. Kitchener had a three-hour meeting (12 August) with Sir John French, Murray, Wilson and the French liaison officer Victor Huguet, before being overruled by the Prime Minister, who eventually agreed that the BEF should assemble at Maubeuge.

Sir John French's orders from Kitchener were to cooperate with the French but not to take orders from them. Given that the tiny BEF (about 100,000 men, half of them serving regulars and half reservists) was Britain's only field army, Kitchener also instructed French to avoid undue losses and exposure to "forward movements where large numbers of French troops are not engaged" until Kitchener himself had had a chance to discuss the matter with the Cabinet.

Meeting with Sir John French
The BEF commander in France, Sir John French, concerned at heavy British losses at the Battle of Le Cateau, was considering withdrawing his forces from the Allied line. By 31 August, French commander-in-chief Joffre, President Poincaré (relayed via Bertie, the British Ambassador) and Kitchener had sent him messages urging him not to do so. Kitchener, authorised by a midnight meeting of whichever Cabinet Ministers could be found, left for France for a meeting with Sir John on 1 September.

They met, together with Viviani (French Prime Minister) and Millerand (now French War Minister). Huguet recorded that Kitchener was "calm, balanced, reflective" whilst Sir John was "sour, impetuous, with congested face, sullen and ill-tempered". On Bertie's advice Kitchener dropped his intention of inspecting the BEF. French and Kitchener moved to a separate room, and no independent account of the meeting exists. After the meeting Kitchener telegraphed the Cabinet that the BEF would remain in the line, although taking care not to be outflanked, and told French to consider this "an instruction". French had a friendly exchange of letters with Joffre.

French had been particularly angry that Kitchener had arrived wearing his field marshal's uniform. This was how Kitchener normally dressed at the time (Hankey thought Kitchener's uniform tactless, but it had probably not occurred to him to change), but French felt that Kitchener was implying that he was his military superior and not simply a cabinet member. By the end of the year French thought that Kitchener had "gone mad" and his hostility had become common knowledge at GHQ and GQG.

1915

Strategy
In January 1915, Field Marshal Sir John French, the commander of the British Expeditionary Force, with the concurrence of other senior commanders (e.g. General Sir Douglas Haig), wanted the New Armies incorporated into existing divisions as battalions rather than sent out as entire divisions. French felt (wrongly) that the war would be over by the summer before the New Army divisions were deployed, as Germany had recently redeployed some divisions to the east, and took the step of appealing to the Prime Minister, Asquith, over Kitchener's head, but Asquith refused to overrule Kitchener. This further damaged relations between French and Kitchener, who had travelled to France in September 1914 during the First Battle of the Marne to order French to resume his place in the Allied line.

Kitchener warned French in January 1915 that the Western Front was a siege line that could not be breached, in the context of Cabinet discussions about amphibious landings on the Baltic or North Sea Coast, or against Turkey. In an effort to find a way to relieve pressure on the Western front, Kitchener proposed an invasion of Alexandretta with Australian and New Zealand Army Corps (ANZAC), New Army, and Indian troops. Alexandretta was an area with a large Christian population and was the strategic centre of the Ottoman Empire's railway network – its capture would have cut the empire in two. Yet he was instead eventually persuaded to support Winston Churchill's disastrous Gallipoli Campaign in 1915–1916. (Churchill's responsibility for the failure of this campaign is debated; for more information see David Fromkin's A Peace to End All Peace.) That failure, combined with the Shell Crisis of 1915 – amidst press publicity engineered by Sir John French – dealt Kitchener's political reputation a heavy blow; Kitchener was popular with the public, so Asquith retained him in office in the new coalition government, but responsibility for munitions was moved to a new ministry headed by David Lloyd George. He was a sceptic about the tank, which is why it was developed under the auspices of Churchill's Admiralty.

With the Russians being pushed back from Poland, Kitchener thought the transfer of German troops west and a possible invasion of Britain increasingly likely, and told the War Council (14 May) that he was not willing to send the New Armies overseas. He wired French (16 May 1915) that he would send no more reinforcements to France until he was clear the German line could be broken, but sent two divisions at the end of May to please Joffre, not because he thought a breakthrough possible. He had wanted to conserve his New Armies to strike a knockout blow in 1916–17, but by the summer of 1915 realised that high casualties and a major commitment to France were inescapable. "Unfortunately we have to make war as we must, and not as we should like" as he told the Dardanelles Committee on 20 August 1915.

At an Anglo-French conference at Calais (6 July) Joffre and Kitchener, who was opposed to "too vigorous" offensives, reached a compromise on "local offensives on a vigorous scale", and Kitchener agreed to deploy New Army divisions to France. An inter-Allied conference at Chantilly (7 July, including Russian, Belgian, Serb and Italian delegates) agreed on coordinated offensives. However, Kitchener now came to support the upcoming Loos offensive. He travelled to France for talks with Joffre and Millerand (16 August). The French leaders believed Russia might sue for peace (Warsaw had fallen on 4 August). Kitchener (19 August) ordered the Loos offensive to proceed, despite the attack being on ground not favoured by French or Haig (then commanding First Army). The Official History later admitted that Kitchener hoped to be appointed Supreme Allied Commander. Liddell Hart speculated that this was why he allowed himself to be persuaded by Joffre. New Army divisions first saw action at Loos in September 1915.

Reduction in powers
Kitchener continued to lose favour with politicians and professional soldiers. He found it "repugnant and unnatural to have to discuss military secrets with a large number of gentlemen with whom he was but barely acquainted". Esher complained that he would either lapse into "obstinacy and silence" or else mull aloud over various difficulties. Milner told Gwynne (18 August 1915) that he thought Kitchener a "slippery fish". By autumn 1915, with Asquith's Coalition close to breaking up over conscription, he was blamed for his opposition to that measure (which would eventually be introduced for single men in January 1916) and for the excessive influence which civilians like Churchill and Haldane had come to exert over strategy, allowing ad hoc campaigns to develop in Sinai, Mesopotamia and Salonika. Generals such as Sir William Robertson were critical of Kitchener's failure to ask the General Staff (whose chief James Wolfe-Murray was intimidated by Kitchener) to study the feasibility of any of these campaigns. These operations were certainly feasible, but assumed a level of competence that the British armed forces proved unable to achieve at that time. Tactical incompetence in the Gallipoli campaign meant that even a fairly straightforward task ended in disaster.

Kitchener advised the Dardanelles Committee (21 October) that Baghdad be seized for the sake of prestige then abandoned as logistically untenable. His advice was no longer accepted without question, but the British forces were eventually besieged and captured at Kut.

Archibald Murray (Chief of the Imperial General Staff) later recorded that Kitchener was "quite unfit for the position of secretary of state" and "impossible", claiming that he never assembled the Army Council as a body, but instead gave them orders separately, and was usually exhausted by Friday. Kitchener was also keen to break up Territorial units whenever possible whilst ensuring that "No 'K' Division left the country incomplete". Murray wrote that "He seldom told the absolute truth and the whole truth" and claimed that it was not until he left on a tour of inspection of Gallipoli and the Near East that Murray was able to inform the Cabinet that volunteering had fallen far below the level needed to maintain a BEF of 70 divisions, requiring the introduction of conscription. The Cabinet insisted on proper General Staff papers being presented in Kitchener's absence.

Asquith, who told Robertson that Kitchener was "an impossible colleague" and "his veracity left much to be desired", hoped that he could be persuaded to remain in the region as Commander-in-Chief and acted in charge of the War Office, but Kitchener took his seals of office with him so he could not be sacked in his absence. Douglas Haig – at that time involved in intrigues to have Robertson appointed Chief of the Imperial General Staff – recommended that Kitchener be appointed Viceroy of India ("where trouble was brewing") but not to the Middle East, where his strong personality would have led to that sideshow receiving too much attention and resources. Kitchener visited Rome and Athens, but Murray warned that he would likely demand the diversion of British troops to fight the Turks in the Sinai.

Kitchener and Asquith were agreed that Robertson should become CIGS, but Robertson refused to do this if Kitchener "continued to be his own CIGS", although given Kitchener's great prestige he did not want him to resign; he wanted the Secretary of State to be sidelined to an advisory role like the Prussian War Minister. Asquith asked them to negotiate an agreement, which they did over the exchange of several draft documents at the Hotel de Crillon in Paris. Kitchener agreed that Robertson alone should present strategic advice to the Cabinet, with Kitchener responsible for recruiting and supplying the Army, although he refused to agree that military orders should go out over Robertson's signature alone – it was agreed that the Secretary of State should continue to sign orders jointly with the CIGS. The agreement was formalised in a Royal Order in Council in January 1916. Robertson was suspicious of efforts in the Balkans and Near East, and was instead committed to major British offensives against Germany on the Western Front – the first of these was to be the Somme in 1916.

1916
Early in 1916 Kitchener visited Douglas Haig, newly appointed Commander-in-Chief of the BEF in France. Kitchener had been a key figure in the removal of Haig's predecessor Sir John French, with whom he had a poor relationship. Haig differed with Kitchener over the importance of Mediterranean efforts and wanted to see a strong General Staff in London, but nonetheless valued Kitchener as a military voice against the "folly" of civilians such as Churchill. However, he thought Kitchener "pinched, tired, and much aged", and thought it sad that his mind was "losing its comprehension" as the time for decisive victory on the Western Front (as Haig and Robertson saw it) approached. Kitchener was somewhat doubtful of Haig's plan to win decisive victory in 1916, and would have preferred smaller and purely attritional attacks, but sided with Robertson in telling the Cabinet that the planned Anglo-French offensive on the Somme should go ahead.

Kitchener was under pressure from French Prime Minister Aristide Briand (29 March 1916) for the British to attack on the Western Front to help relieve the pressure of the German attack at Verdun. The French refused to bring troops home from Salonika, which Kitchener thought a play for the increase of French power in the Mediterranean.

On 2 June 1916, Kitchener personally answered questions asked by politicians about his running of the war effort; at the start of hostilities Kitchener had ordered two million rifles from various US arms manufacturers. Only 480 of these rifles had arrived in the UK by 4 June 1916. The number of shells supplied was no less paltry. Kitchener explained the efforts he had made to secure alternative supplies. He received a resounding vote of thanks from the 200 Members of Parliament (MPs) who had arrived to question him, both for his candour and for his efforts to keep the troops armed; Sir Ivor Herbert, who, a week before, had introduced the failed vote of censure in the House of Commons against Kitchener's running of the War Department, personally seconded the motion.

Death

Russian mission
In the midst of his other political and military concerns, Kitchener had devoted personal attention to the deteriorating situation on the Eastern Front. This included the provision of extensive stocks of war material for the Russian armies, which had been under increasing pressure since mid-1915. In May 1916, the Chancellor of the Exchequer Reginald McKenna suggested that Kitchener head a special and confidential mission to Russia to discuss munition shortages, military strategy and financial difficulties with the Imperial Russian Government and the Stavka (military high command), which was now under the personal command of Tsar Nicholas II. Both Kitchener and the Russians were in favor of face to face talks, and a formal invitation from the Tsar was received on 14 May. Kitchener left London by train for Scotland on the evening of 4 June with a party of officials, military aides and personal servants.

Lost at sea

Kitchener sailed from Scrabster to Scapa Flow on 5 June 1916 aboard HMS Oak. He had lunch with Admiral Sir John Jellicoe, commander-in-chief of the Grand Fleet, on board his flagship HMS Iron Duke; Kitchener was keen to discuss the recent Battle of Jutland and stated that he was looking forward to his three-week diplomatic mission to Russia as a break from domestic pressures. He then set out for Russia on board the armoured cruiser HMS Hampshire. At the last minute Jellicoe changed Hampshires route on the basis of a mis-reading of the weather forecast and ignoring (or not being aware of) recent intelligence and sightings of German U-boat activity in the vicinity of the amended route. Shortly before 7:30 pm that same day, while steaming for the Russian port of Arkhangelsk during a force 9 gale, Hampshire struck a mine laid by the newly launched German U-boat U-75 (commanded by Kurt Beitzen) and sank west of the Orkney Islands. Recent research has set the death toll of those aboard Hampshire at 737. Only twelve men survived. Among the dead were all ten members of Kitchener's entourage. Kitchener himself was seen standing on the quarterdeck during the approximately twenty minutes that it took the ship to sink. His body was never recovered.

The news of Kitchener's death was received with shock all over the British Empire. A man in Yorkshire committed suicide at the news; a sergeant on the Western Front was heard to exclaim "Now we've lost the war. Now we've lost the war"; and a nurse wrote home to her family that she knew Britain would win as long as Kitchener lived, and now that he was gone: "How awful it is – a far worse blow than many German victories. So long as he was with us we knew even if things were gloomy that his guiding hand was at the helm."

General Douglas Haig commanding the British Armies on the Western Front remarked on first receiving the news of Kitchener's death via a German radio signal intercepted by the British Army, "How shall we get on without him". King George V wrote in his diary: "It is indeed a heavy blow to me and a great loss to the nation and the allies." He ordered army officers to wear black armbands for a week.

C. P. Scott, editor of The Manchester Guardian, is said to have remarked that "as for the old man, he could not have done better than to have gone down, as he was a great impediment lately".

Conspiracy theories
Kitchener's great fame, the suddenness of his death, and its apparently convenient timing for a number of parties gave almost immediate rise to a number of conspiracy theories about his death. One in particular was posited by Lord Alfred Douglas (of Oscar Wilde fame), positing a connection between Kitchener's death, the recent naval Battle of Jutland, Winston Churchill, and a Jewish conspiracy. Churchill successfully sued Douglas in what proved to be the last successful case of criminal libel in British legal history, and the latter spent six months in prison. Another claimed that Hampshire did not strike a mine at all, but was sunk by explosives secreted in the vessel by Irish Republicans.

General Erich Ludendorff, Generalquartiermeister and joint head (with Paul von Hindenburg) of Germany's war effort stated in the 1920s that Russian communists working against the Tsar had betrayed the plan to visit the Russians to the German command. His account was that Kitchener was "[killed] because of his ability" as it was feared he would help the tsarist Russian Army to recover.

In 1926, a hoaxer named Frank Power claimed in the Sunday Referee newspaper that Kitchener's body had been found by a Norwegian fisherman. Power brought a coffin back from Norway and prepared it for burial in St Paul's Cathedral. At this point, however, the authorities intervened and the coffin was opened in the presence of police and a distinguished pathologist. The box was found to contain only tar for weight. There was widespread public outrage at Power, but he was never prosecuted.

Frederick Joubert Duquesne, a Boer soldier and spy, claimed that he had assassinated Kitchener after an earlier attempt to kill him in Cape Town failed. He was arrested and court-martialled in Cape Town and sent to the penal colony of Bermuda, but managed to escape to the U.S. MI5 confirmed that Duquesne was "a German intelligence officer ... involved in a series of acts of sabotage against British shipping in South American waters during the [First World] war"; he was wanted for: "murder on the high seas, the sinking and burning of British ships, the burning of military stores, warehouses, coaling stations, conspiracy, and the falsification of Admiralty documents".

Duquesne's unverified story was that he returned to Europe, posed as the Russian Duke Boris Zakrevsky in 1916, and joined Kitchener in Scotland. While on board HMS Hampshire with Kitchener, Duquesne claimed to have signalled a German submarine that then sank the cruiser, and was rescued by the submarine, later being awarded the Iron Cross for his efforts.  Duquesne was later apprehended and tried by the authorities in the U.S. for insurance fraud, but managed to escape again.

During the Second World War, Duquesne ran a German spy ring in the United States until he was caught by the FBI in what became the biggest roundup of spies in U.S. history: the Duquesne Spy Ring.  Coincidentally, Kitchener's brother was to die in office in Bermuda in 1912, and his nephew, Major H.H. Hap Kitchener, who had married a Bermudian, purchased (with a legacy left to him by his uncle) Hinson's Islandpart of the former Prisoner of War camp from which Duquesne had escapedafter the First World War as the location of his home and business.

Legacy
Kitchener is officially remembered in a chapel on the northwest corner of St Paul's Cathedral in London, near the main entrance, where a memorial service was held in his honour.

In Canada, the city of Berlin, Ontario, named in respect to a large German immigrant settler population, was renamed Kitchener following a 1916 referendum.

Since 1970, the opening of new records has led historians to rehabilitate Kitchener's reputation to some extent. Robin Neillands, for instance, notes that Kitchener consistently rose in ability as he was promoted. Some historians now praise his strategic vision in the First World War, especially his laying the groundwork for the expansion of munitions production and his central role in the raising of the British army in 1914 and 1915, providing a force capable of meeting Britain's continental commitment.

His commanding image, appearing on recruiting posters demanding "Your country needs you!", remains recognised and parodied in popular culture.

In the 2021 movie The King's Man, Kitchener is portrayed by Charles Dance.

Memorials

As a British soldier who was lost at sea in the First World War and has no known grave, Kitchener is commemorated on the Commonwealth War Graves Commission's Hollybrook Memorial at Hollybrook Cemetery, located at Southampton, Hampshire.
Blue plaques have been erected to mark where Kitchener lived in Carlton Gardens, Westminster and at Broome Park near Canterbury.
 The NW chapel of All Souls at St Paul's Cathedral, London, not normally open to visitors, was rededicated the Kitchener Memorial in 1925. The memorial is however clearly visible from the main entrance lobby. The recumbent white marble figure was designed by Detmar Blow. The figure, plus the statues of Saint George and Saint Michael and the Pieta in the chapel were sculpted by William Reid Dick.
 A month after his death, the Lord Kitchener National Memorial Fund was set up by the Lord Mayor of London to honour his memory. It was used to aid casualties of the war, both practically and financially; following the war's end, the fund was used to enable university educations for soldiers, ex-soldiers, their sons and their daughters, a function it continues to perform today.  A Memorial Book of tributes and remembrances from Kitchener's peers, edited by Sir Hedley Le Bas, was printed to benefit the fund.
 The Lord Kitchener Memorial Homes in Chatham, Kent, were built with funds from public subscription following Kitchener's death. A small terrace of cottages, they are used to provide affordable rented accommodation for servicemen and women who have seen active service or their widows and widowers.
 A statue of Kitchener mounted on a horse is on Khartoum Road (near Fort Amherst) in Chatham, Kent.
 The Kitchener Memorial on Mainland, Orkney, is on the cliff edge at Marwick Head (HY2325), near the spot where Kitchener died at sea. It is a square, crenellated stone tower with the inscription: "This tower was raised by the people of Orkney in memory of Field Marshal Earl Kitchener of Khartoum on that corner of his country which he had served so faithfully nearest to the place where he died on duty. He and his staff perished along with the officers and nearly all the men of HMS Hampshire on 5 June 1916."
 In the early 1920s, a road on a new council estate in the Kates Hill area of Dudley, Worcestershire (now West Midlands) was named Kitchener Road in honour of Kitchener.
 The east window of the chancel at St George's Church, Eastergate, West Sussex has stained glass commemorating Kitchener.
 In December 2013, the Royal Mint announced their plans to mint commemorative two-pound coins in 2014 featuring Kitchener's "Call to Arms" on the reverse.
 A memorial cross for Kitchener was unveiled at St Botolph-without-Bishopsgate church in 1916 (near Liverpool Street station), perhaps one of the first memorials of the First World War in England.
 One of the three houses of the Rashtriya Indian Military College, Dehradun, India was named after Kitchener.
 A memorial tree was dedicated to Kitchener a month after his death along the Avenue of Honour in the former town of Eurack, Victoria and remains today whilst the surrounding township no longer exists.
 Half-a-dozen local communities inscribed Kitchener's name on to the memorials they were already building to their own dead, alongside the names of ordinary soldiers and sailors who had answered his 1914 appeal for volunteers and would never return.

Debate on Kitchener's sexuality
Kitchener was a lifelong bachelor. From his time in Egypt in 1892, he gathered around him a cadre of eager young and unmarried officers nicknamed "Kitchener's band of boys", who included his friend Captain Oswald Fitzgerald, his "constant and inseparable companion", whom he appointed his aide-de-camp to Queen Victoria (1888–1896). They remained close until they died together on their voyage to Russia. Rumour occasionally circulated that Kitchener was homosexual, and after his death a number of biographers suggested or hinted that he might have been a latent or active homosexual.

Professor C. Brad Faught, chair of the Department of History at Tyndale University College, discusses Kitchener's sexuality in a 2016 biography. While acknowledging Kitchener's "vestigal femininity" in collecting porcelain and organising dinner parties, plus emotional repression typical of his class and time, Faught concludes that the absolute absence of evidence either way leaves "an issue about which historians can say almost nothing useful". Biographer George H. Cassar argues that Kitchener's letters to his sister include evidence of heterosexual attraction and that if there were any credible evidence that Kitchener was homosexual, it would have been used by his many opponents during his lifetime.

Honours and decorations

Decorations

Kitchener received numerous campaign and commemorative decorations from the British government, as well as several medals from allied nations.
His other decorations included:
British
Knight of the Order of the Garter (KG) – 3 June 1915
Knight of the Order of St Patrick (KP) – 19 June 1911
Knight Grand Cross of the Order of the Bath (GCB) – 15 November 1898 (KCB – 17 November 1896; CB – 8 November 1889)
 Member of the Order of Merit (OM) – 12 July 1902
Knight Grand Commander of the Order of the Star of India (GCSI) – 25 June 1909
Knight Grand Cross of the Order of St Michael and St George (GCMG) – 29 November 1900 (KCMG – 12 February 1894; CMG – 6 August 1886)
Knight Grand Commander of the Order of the Indian Empire (GCIE) – 1 January 1908
Foreign
Order of Osmanieh (Ottoman Empire) first class – 7 December 1896 (second class – 30 April 1894; third class – 11 June 1885)
Order of the Medjidie (Ottoman Empire) first class – 18 November 1893 (second class – 18 June 1888)
Order of Karađorđe's Star with swords, Kingdom of Serbia – 1918

Honorary regimental appointments
Honorary Colonel, Scottish Command Telegraph Companies (Army Troops, Royal Engineers) – 1898
Honorary Colonel, East Anglian Divisional Engineers, Royal Engineers – 1901
Honorary Colonel, 5th (7th Royal Lancashire Militia) Battalion, Lancashire Fusiliers – 11 June 1902; later 3rd (Reserve) Battalion, Lancashire Fusiliers
Honorary Colonel, 4th, later 6th Battalion, Royal Scots – 1905
Colonel Commandant, Royal Engineers – 1906
Honorary Colonel, 7th Gurkha Rifles – 1908
Honorary Colonel, 1st County of London Yeomanry – 1910
Colonel-in-Chief, Corps of New Zealand Engineers – 1911
Regimental Colonel, Irish Guards – 1914

Honorary degrees and offices
Freedom of the borough, Southampton, 12 July 1902
Freedom of the borough, Ipswich, 22 September 1902
Freedom of the city, Sheffield, 30 September 1902.
Freedom of the borough, Chatham, 4 October 1902
Honorary Freedom of the City of Liverpool, 11 October 1902
Honorary Freeman of the Worshipful Company of Fishmongers
Honorary Freeman of the Worshipful Company of Grocers, 1 August 1902.

See also
 Anglo-Egyptian conquest of Sudan – a reconquest of territory lost by the Khedives of Egypt in 1884 and 1885 during the Mahdist War
 Frances Parker – niece and a New Zealand-born British suffragette. 
 I Was Lord Kitchener's Valet – a clothing boutique which achieved fame in 1960s "Swinging London" 
 Kitchener's Army – an all-volunteer army formed in the United Kingdom from 1914 
 Kitchener bun – a type of sweet pastry made and sold in South Australia
 Kitchener, Ontario – Canadian city renamed from Berlin after Kitchener's death
 Scapegoats of the Empire – a book by George Witton
 Statue of the Earl Kitchener, London

References

Sources
 
 
 
 
 

 
 
 
 
 
 
 
 
 
 
 

 Alt URL

Further reading
 
 
 Chesterton, G. K. (1917). Lord Kitchener. London: The Field & Queen. archived
 
 
 
 
 
 
 
 
 
 
 
  new edition Cassell (2006).

Notes

External links

 
 
 
 Kitchener Scholars' Fund
 The Melik Society
 National Portrait Gallery 112 portraits
 Lord Kitchener: Active Soldier, Active Freemason
 

|-

|-

|-

|-

|-

|-

|-

|-

|-

|-

1850 births
1916 deaths
British field marshals
Field marshals of Egypt
British Commanders-in-Chief of India
Secretaries of State for War (UK)
British consuls-general in Egypt
Governors-General of Anglo-Egyptian Sudan
Earls Kitchener
Knights of the Garter
Knights of St Patrick
Irish knights
Knights Grand Cross of the Order of the Bath
Members of the Order of Merit
Knights Grand Commander of the Order of the Star of India
Knights Grand Cross of the Order of St Michael and St George
Knights Grand Commander of the Order of the Indian Empire
Knights of Justice of the Order of St John
Members of the Privy Council of the United Kingdom
People of the Franco-Prussian War
British people of Irish descent
British Army personnel of the Mahdist War
British Army personnel of the Second Boer War
British Army generals of World War I
British military personnel killed in World War I
Graduates of the Royal Military Academy, Woolwich
Mandatory Palestine
People lost at sea
Royal Engineers officers
Lancashire Militia officers
19th-century Anglo-Irish people
20th-century Anglo-Irish people
People from County Kerry
Diplomatic peers
Rectors of the University of Edinburgh
British Freemasons
Palestinologists
Historical geographers
Freemasons of the United Grand Lodge of England
Politicians awarded knighthoods
Peers of the United Kingdom created by Queen Victoria
Burials at Hollybrook Cemetery
Peers created by Edward VII
Peers created by George V
Members of the Council of the Governor General of India
Military personnel from County Kerry